The 2009–10 NCAA Division I men's ice hockey season began on October 8, 2009 and concluded with the 2010 NCAA Division I men's ice hockey tournament's championship game on April 10, 2010 at Ford Field in Detroit, Michigan. Denver and Miami entered the season as the nations' two top ranked teams. This was the 63rd season in which an NCAA ice hockey championship was held and is the 116th year overall where an NCAA school fielded a team.

Pre-season polls

The top 20 from USCHO.com/CBS College Sports, October 5, 2009, and the top 15 from USA Today/USA Hockey Magazine, September 29, 2009.

Regular season

Standings

2010 NCAA tournament

Note: * denotes overtime period(s)

Player stats

Scoring leaders
The following players led the league in points at the conclusion of the season.

  
GP = Games played; G = Goals; A = Assists; Pts = Points; PIM = Penalty minutes

Leading goaltenders
The following goaltenders led the league in goals against average at the end of the regular season while playing at least 33% of their team's total minutes.

GP = Games played; Min = Minutes played; W = Wins; L = Losses; OT = Overtime/shootout losses; GA = Goals against; SO = Shutouts; SV% = Save percentage; GAA = Goals against average

Awards

NCAA

Atlantic Hockey

CCHA

CHA

ECAC

Hockey East

WCHA

See also
 2009–10 NCAA Division II men's ice hockey season
 2009–10 NCAA Division III men's ice hockey season
 NCAA Men's Division I Ice Hockey
 2009–10 NCAA Division I women's ice hockey season
 2009–10 Atlantic Hockey season

References

External links
USCHO.com

 
2009–10 in American ice hockey by league